The AN/SPN-46(V)1 is a Precision Approach and Landing System, manufactured in the United States, by Textron Systems, which is used on aircraft carriers of the United States Navy. The radar uses two dual-band radar antennas, which also function as transmitters, to guide planes or helicopters to the ship.

History
The system was first tested in 1984, by the Patuxent River division of the Naval Air Warfare Center Aircraft Division, in Maryland. In 1985 an AN/SPN-46(V)1 system was placed on the aircraft carrier . In 1986 and 1987 OPEVALs were held for the radar system. In 1987 the Navy approved the system for "full automatic control from aircraft acquisition at ten nautical miles to touchdown on the deck". Over a period of time between 1987 and 1991, five systems were delivered to the Navy. While the sixth was still being built, its builders, Bell Aircraft, a subsidiary of Textron Systems, were merged with Textron Defense Systems, another subsidiary of Textron Systems. Soon after that another seven radar systems were made, five of which went to replace AN/SPN-42A radar systems, and two of which went to newly commissioned aircraft carriers. The V1 system was phased out of production in 1998, but is planned to remain in service until 2025.

Specifications
The AN/SPN-46(V)1 uses six AN/AYK-14 computers for processing, is employs a MK 16 Mod 12 shipboard stabilization unit.

References

External links 
FAS site

Naval radars
Military radars of the United States
Military equipment introduced in the 1980s